The Glenwood Shale is a thin Ordivician shale formation in the sedimentary sequence characteristic of the upper Midwestern United States.

It lies under the Platteville Limestone and above the Saint Peter Sandstone. Together, these three units represent a sequence of sea level rise during Ordovician time. Because it is often very thin (~10 cm or less in the Twin Cities), it is often ignored in the general stratigraphy.

References
University of Minnesota: River Bluffs homepage

Ordovician System of North America
Shale formations of the United States
Ordovician Minnesota
Ordovician geology of Wisconsin